

The Academy Hotel, Bloomsbury 

The Academy is a 5 star London hotel with 50 rooms / suites, located in the Garden Square district of Bloomsbury. The hotel, which originally opened in March 2000, was originally five private homes built in 1776. In 2018, the hotel underwent a renovation by YTL Hotels and Champalimaud Design. The hotel is part of the Small Luxury Hotels of the World collection.

References

Hotels in London
2000 establishments in England